Devil Doll may refer to:

 The Devil-Doll, a 1936 film
 Devil Doll (film), a 1964 film
 Devil Dolls (2012 film), a 2012 DVD that features edited versions of three Full Moon Features films
 Devil Doll (Slovenian band), an Italian-Slovenian experimental rock band
 Devil Doll (American band), rockabilly band fronted by Colleen Duffy, an American singer

 "Devil Doll", a song written by Sam Phillips and recorded by Roy Orbison on Roy Orbison at the Rock House